The 2014 FIFA World Cup qualification UEFA Group D was a UEFA qualifying group for the 2014 FIFA World Cup. The group comprised Netherlands, Turkey, Hungary, Romania, Estonia and Andorra.

The group winners, Netherlands, qualified directly for the 2014 FIFA World Cup. Romania placed among the eight best runners-up and advanced to the play-offs, where they were drawn to play home-and-away matches against Greece. However, they failed to qualify for the World Cup after losing the first match and drawing the second.

Standings

Matches
A meeting was held on 24 October 2011 in Amsterdam, Netherlands, to determine the fixtures. The meeting, however, was not successful and a schedule could not be determined.  FIFA gave the teams involved until late December 2011 to finalise the schedule, with the set of fixtures determined by a draw held on 21 December in Amsterdam.

Notes

Goalscorers
There were 96 goals scored in 30 matches for an average of 3.20 goals per match.

11 goals

 Robin van Persie

5 goals

 Jeremain Lens
 Rafael van der Vaart
 Ciprian Marica
 Umut Bulut
 Burak Yılmaz

4 goals

 Balázs Dzsudzsák

3 goals

 Arjen Robben
 Gabriel Torje

2 goals

 Konstantin Vassiljev
 Dániel Böde
 Zoltán Gera
 Tamás Hajnal
 Vladimir Koman
 Ádám Szalai
 Klaas-Jan Huntelaar
 Bruno Martins Indi
 Ruben Schaken
 Costin Lazăr
 Mevlüt Erdinç
 Selçuk İnan

1 goal

 Henri Anier
 Tarmo Kink
 Joel Lindpere
 Andres Oper
 Roland Juhász
 Krisztián Németh
 Nemanja Nikolić
 Tamás Priskin
 Vilmos Vanczak
 Luciano Narsingh
 Wesley Sneijder
 Kevin Strootman
 Alexandru Chipciu
 Valerică Găman
 Gheorghe Grozav
 Alexandru Maxim
 Adrian Mutu
 Mihai Pintilii
 Cristian Tănase
 Claudiu Keșerü
 Bogdan Stancu
 Emre Belözoğlu
 Arda Turan

1 own goal

 Ildefons Lima (playing against Hungary)
 Szilárd Devecseri (playing against Netherlands)
 Ragnar Klavan (playing against Hungary)

Discipline

References

External links
Results and schedule for UEFA Group D (FIFA.com version)
Results and schedule for UEFA Group D (UEFA.com version)

D
2012–13 in Dutch football
Qual
2012–13 in Hungarian football
2013–14 in Hungarian football
2012–13 in Romanian football
2013–14 in Romanian football
2012–13 in Turkish football
2013–14 in Turkish football
2012–13 in Andorran football
2013–14 in Andorran football
2012 in Estonian football
2013 in Estonian football